Zhang Yan (born July 8, 1988) is a Chinese pair skater. With partner Wang Wenting, he is the 2013 Chinese national silver medalist.

Programs 
(with Wang)

Competitive highlights 
(with Wang)

References

External links 
 

1988 births
Chinese male pair skaters
Living people
Sportspeople from Qiqihar
Figure skaters from Heilongjiang